Canadian folk music has a long history, dating from the 16th and 17th century, mostly derived from the music of early settlers; much earlier for the music of indigenous people. Folk music thus differentiates between traditional and contemporary. Many of Canada's most influential folk artists emerged in the contemporary folk music era, notably Bruce Cockburn, Buffy Sainte-Marie, Ferron, Gordon Lightfoot, Joni Mitchell, Kate & Anna McGarrigle, Leonard Cohen, Murray McLauchlan, Stan Rogers, Valdy, Penny Lang, The Rankin Family and Wade Hemsworth. In the 1970s, chansonniers grew steadily less popular with the encroachment of popular rock bands and other artists, and many of the folk clubs, such as the Montreal Folk Workshop, and groups such as The Raftsmen, the Mountain City Four and, eventually, The Travellers, that had served to foster the mid-20th century revival closed down.  Some new performers did emerge, however, including Jacques Michel, Claude Dubois, and Robert Charlebois. The Canadian Folk Music Awards are presented annually to musicians carrying on in the tradition.

Elements of Canadian Folk Music 
Most genres of music have their known instruments that are played to compose a song. The principal instrument for Canadian folk music is known to be the fiddle. The first record of a fiddle in Canada is in 1645 at a wedding in Quebec on the 27th of November. After this account it seems that reports of fiddles are rare for the next 100 years. However, despite this hiatus in reports, the fiddle remains a well-known instrument among folk musicians and music.

References

 
Canadian styles of music
Folk music by country